Eupithecia coloradensis is a moth in the family Geometridae first described by George Duryea Hulst in 1896. It is found in North America from western Quebec and western Ontario south to North Carolina, west to New Mexico, Arizona, Colorado and south-eastern Alberta.

The wingspan is 14–19 mm. The forewings are dark brownish grey, with a reddish-brown costa. The hindwings are slightly paler brownish grey.

References

Moths described in 1896
coloradensis
Moths of North America